The New York City Mayor's Office of Management and Budget (OMB), formerly New York City Office of Management and Budget, is the New York City government's chief financial agency, organized as part of the New York City Mayor's office. OMB staff, under the direction of the Mayor and the Budget Director, assemble and oversee the expense, revenue, and capital budgets for the city. The City of New York funds the activities of approximately 70 agencies with more than 300,000 full-time and full-time equivalent employees.

OMB evaluates the cost-effectiveness of city services and proposals, both from the agencies and New York City Council. OMB employs economists to provide forecasts on city, state, nation, and world economies. OMB also manages the city's capital financing programs through the issuing of bonds, and conducts legal reviews of capital projects financed with bond proceeds.

New York City has the largest municipal budget in the United States at $95.1 billion in Fiscal Year 2021 (as of the City's January 2021 Financial Plan).

History
By 1788, the Treasurer of the City prepared the budget, and in 1830 this duty fell to the Comptroller. In 1853, a Board of Commissioners was established comprising the Mayor, the Comptroller and the Presidents of the Board of Alderman and the Board of Assistants, to pass on the appropriations of the Alms House Department and the Board of Education before such appropriations should be submitted to the Board of Supervisors. This lasted until 1871, when the Board of Estimate and Apportionment was established and charged with the duty of apportioning the revenue resulting from tax assessments on property valuation.

In 1881, the Commissioners of Accounts prepared an annual statement of expenditures of all departments for use in budgeting. In 1914, a separate budget and efficiency staff was set up in the Office of the Commissioners of Accounts. The Board of Estimate and Apportionment also set up three agencies to assist in the preparation of the budget - the Bureau of Standards (later the Bureau of Personnel Service), the Bureau of Contract Supervision, and the Committee on Education. All of these agencies were abolished in 1918 and the Board of Estimate and Apportionment's examiners, who were transferred to the secretary's office at that time, later became the nucleus of the Bureau of the Budget. In 1924, the position of Director of Budget was created as part of the Mayor's Office by the Board of Estimate and Apportionment. In 1933 The Bureau of the Budget was established by Local Law 11 with the Director of the Budget at its head.

In 1976, the Bureau was renamed the Office of Management and Budget, and was granted its current responsibility for assisting the Mayor in developing and implementing the City's budget, and for advising the Mayor on policy affecting the City's fiscal stability and the effectiveness of City services.

Budget Director
The agency is headed by a commissioner-level appointment, known as the Budget Director, responsible for drafting the city's budget, turning the Mayor's policy goals into a fiscally responsible and balanced budget. The Budget Director also serves ex officio on various boards, including the New York City Municipal Water Authority, which issues bonds for the capital plan of the NYC Department of Environmental Protection, the New York City Transitional Finance Authority, and TSASC, Inc., a local development corporation whose debt is secured by tobacco settlement revenues. Both issue bonds to finance the city’s capital plan. The current Budget Director is Jacques Jiha.

Budget Directors

Notable former employees
 Peter C. Goldmark Jr., public servant, journalist former assistant director
 Michael P. Jacobson, professor, former deputy director
 Helen Rosenthal, New York City Councilmember, former assistant director
 Anthony Shorris, former First Deputy Mayor, former deputy director
 David Yassky, law professor, former budget analyst

See also
 Economy of New York City
 New York City Department of Finance

References

External links
 
 New York City Transitional Finance Authority
 TSASC Inc.
 New York City Municipal Water Authority

Government departments of New York City